Karoliina is a Finnish and Estonian feminine given name derived from Charles. People with the name include:

Karoliina Blackburn (born 1972), Finnish actress and Muay Thai boxer
Karoliina Kallio (born 1979), Finnish singer and actor
Karoliina Lundahl (born 1968), Finnish weightlifter
Karoliina Rantamäki (born 1978), Finnish female ice hockey player

See also

Karolina (name)

Finnish feminine given names